Saharanpur district is the northernmost of the districts of Uttar Pradesh state, India. Bordering the states of Haryana, Himachal Pradesh and Uttarakhand, and close to the foothills of Shivalik range, it lies in the northern part of the Doab region. It is primarily an agricultural area.

The district headquarters are in Saharanpur, which is also the headquarters of Saharanpur Division. Other principal towns are Behat, Deoband, Gangoh and Rampur Maniharan.

Geography
It is bordered by Yamunanagar and Karnal districts of Haryana to the west, Sirmaur district of Himachal Pradesh to the northwest, Dehradun district of Uttarakhand to the north, Haridwar district of Uttarakhand to the east and Muzaffarnagar and Shamli districts to the south.

It is the northernmost district of Uttar Pradesh, bounded by the Yamuna to the west. The northern border of the district is formed by the southern slopes of the Sivallik Hills. Below the Sivallik is the Bhabhar, and south of that, the Terai. The west of the district is khadir land next to the Yamuna, generally composed of clayish soil, and produces two small tributaries of the Yamuna: the Budhi and Saindh.

Historical

Medieval period
During the reign of Shamsu’d-Din Iltutmish (r 1211–1236), the region became a part of the Delhi Sultanate. At that time, most of the area remained covered with forests and marshlands, through which the Paondhoi, Dhamola, and Ganda Nala rivers flowed. The climate was humid and malaria outbreaks were common. Muhammad bin Tughluq, the Sultan of Delhi (1325–1351), undertook a campaign in the northern doab to crush the rebellion of the Shivalik kings in 1340, when according to local tradition he learned of the presence of a sufi saint on the banks of the Paondhoi River. After visiting the sage, he ordered that henceforth this region would be known as 'Shah-Haroonpur', after the Sufi Saint Shah Haroon Chishti. The simple but well-preserved tomb of this saint is situated in the oldest quarter of Saharanpur city, between the Mali Gate/Bazar Dinanath and Halwai Hatta. By the end of the 14th century, the power of the Sultanate had declined and it was attacked by Emperor Timur (1336–1405) of Central Asia. Timur had marched through the Saharanpur region in 1399 to sack Delhi and people of the region fought his army unsuccessfully. A weakened Sultanate was later conquered by the Central Asian Mogul king Babur (1483–1531).

Mughal period
In the 16th century, Babur, a Timurid descendant of Timur and Genghis Khan from Fergana Valley (modern-day Uzbekistan), invaded across the Khyber Pass and founded the Mughal Empire, covering India, along with modern-day Afghanistan, Pakistan and Bangladesh The Mughals were descended from Persianised Central Asian Turks (with significant Mongol admixture).

During the Mughal period, Akbar (1542–1605), Saharanpur became an administrative unit under the Province of Delhi. Akbar bestowed the feudal jagir of Saharanpur to the Mughal treasurer, Sah Ranveer Singh, a Hindu Rohilla who laid the foundations of the present-day city on the site of an army cantonment. The nearest settlements at that time were Shekhpura and Malhipur. Saharanpur was a walled city, with four gates: the Sarai Gate, the Mali Gate, the Buria Gate, and the Lakhi Gate. The city was divided into the neighbourhoods named Nakhasa Bazar, Shah Behlol, Rani Bazar and Lakhi Gate. The ruins of Shah Ran Veer Singh's old fort can still be seen in the Chaudharian locality of Saharanpur, not far from the better known 'Bada-Imam-bada'. He also built a large Jain temple in Muhallah/Toli Chaundhariyan, it is now known as the 'Digamber-Jain Panchayati Mandir'.

The Sayyids and Rohillas
Mughal emperors Akbar and later Shah Jehan (1592–1666) bestowed the administrative pargana of Sarwat on Muslim Sayyid families. In 1633 one of them founded a city and named it and the surrounding region Muzaffarnagar, in honour of his father, Sayyid Muzaffar Ali Khan. The Sayyids ruled the area until the 1739 invasion by Nadir Shah. After his departure, anarchy prevailed across the entire doab with the region ruled or ravaged in succession by Jats. Taking advantage of this anarchy, the Rohillas took control of the entire trans-Gangetic region.

Ahmad Shah Durrani, the Afghan ruler who invaded Northwestern and Northern India in the 1750s, conferred the territory of Saharanpur as Jagir on Rohilla chief Najaf Khan, who assumed the title of Nawab Najeeb-ud-Daula and took up residence in Saharanpur in 1754,. He made Gaunsgarh his capital and tried to strengthen his position against Maratha Empire attacks by entering an alliance with the Hindu Gurjar chieftain Manohar Singh. In 1759, Najeeb-ud-Daula issued a Deed of Agreement handing over 550 villages to Manohar Singh, who became the Raja of Landaura.

Maratha period
In 1757, the Maratha army captured the Saharanpur region, which resulted in Najeeb-ud-Daula losing control of Saharanpur to the Maratha rulers Raghunath Rao and Malharao Holkar. The conflict between Rohillas and Marathas came to an end on 18December 1788 with the arrest of Ghulam Qadir, the grandson of Najeeb-ud-Daula, who was defeated by the Maratha general Mahadaji Scindia. The most significant contribution of Nawab Ghulam Qadir to Saharanpur city is the Nawab Ganj area and the Ahmedabadi fortress therein, which still stands. The death of Ghulam Qadir put an end to the Rohilla administration in Saharanpur and it became the northernmost district of the Maratha Empire. Ghani Bahadur Banda was appointed its first Maratha governor. The Maratha Regime saw the construction of the Bhuteshwar Temple and Bagheshwar Temple in Saharanpur city. In 1803, following the Second Anglo-Maratha War, when the British East India Company defeated the Maratha Empire, Saharanpur came under British suzerainty.

British colonial period (1803–1947 AD)

When India rebelled in 1857 against the foreign Company's occupation, now referred to as the First War of Indian Independence, the Saharanpur and the present-day Muzaffarnagar Districts were part of that uprising. The centre of freedom fighters' operations was Shamli, a small town in the Muzaffarnagar region which was liberated for some time. After the uprising failed, British retribution was severe. Death and destruction was particularly directed against the Muslims of the region, whom the British considered as the main instigators of the rebellion; Muslim society was devastated beyond recognition. When social reconstruction started, the cultural and political history of Muslims began to revolve around Deoband and Aligarh. Muhammad Qasim Nanautawi and Rashid Ahmad Gangohi, both proponents of the reformer Shah Waliullah's ideology for social and political rejuvenation, established a school in Deoband in 1867. It found popularity and global recognition as the Darul Uloom Deoband. Its founders' mission was twofold: to raise and spread a team of scholars able to awaken the religious and social consciousness of Muslims through peaceful methods and to make efforts, through them, to educate Muslims in their faith and culture; and to bring about a feeling of nationalism and national unity by promoting the concept of Hindu-Muslim unity and a united India. Muslim scholars in the city of Saharanpur were active supporters of this ideology and went on to establish the Mazahir Uloom theological seminary six months later.

Demographics

According to the 2011 census the Saharanpur district had a population of 3,466,382, roughly equal to the nation of Panama or the US state of Connecticut. This gives it a ranking of 92nd in India (out of a total of 640). Its population growth rate over the decade 2001-2011 was 19.59%. Saharanpur has a sex ratio of 887 females for every 1000 males, and a literacy rate of 72.03%. Scheduled Castes and Scheduled Tribes make up 22.05% and 0.03% of the population respectively.

Religion

Hinduism is followed by over 56% of people. Islam is the second-largest religion in the district with over 44.95% adherents. Sikhism is followed by 0.54% people. Hindus generally dominate rural areas while Muslims are majority in urban areas.

Languages

At the time of the 2011 Census of India, 80.90% of the population of the district spoke Hindi and 18.57% Urdu as their first language.

Education

Medical College
Sheikh-Ul-Hind Mahmood Mahmood Hasan Medical College, a government medical college which provides healthcare for all citizens of the state and to train students. The present medical college is planned to have a 500-bed hospital with road access to the Saharanpur-Ambala National Highway. The proposed annual intake of MBBS Students is expected to be 100 from 2014 to 2015.

References

 
Districts of Uttar Pradesh
Minority Concentrated Districts in India
1804 establishments in the British Empire